Vũ Thu Minh (born September 22, 1977) often known simply as Thu Minh, is a Vietnamese pop-singer. She is famous for pop ballads and dance-pop music and is referred to as the "Queen of Dance-pop in Vietnam". Thu Minh is also called "Vietnam's Celine Dion"  and "The wind chime of Vietnamese music" due to her famous and rare soprano C or Lyric soprano singing voice that has a range from C3 (low) to C7 (high) with the highest belt note C#6, headvoice E6, and some whistle. She originally trained to be a ballet dancer, and, before the age of 30, she had never taken officially any professional music school.

Thu Minh became famous winning first prize as the youngest contestant in the live singing competition Broadcast of Ho Chi Minh at the age of 16. She then became well known for the success of many Viet classic songs, pre-war music, love songs in 1954–1975, pop ballad, pop in both English and Vietnamese. She also covered some famous ballads of Whitney Houston, Celine Dion, including "I Will Always Love You" and "All by Myself"

The biggest turning point in her musical career came with the success of the songs "Chuông gió" ("Wind chime"), "Bóng mây qua thềm", and "Nhớ anh" ("Missing you"). In more recent years, Minh came out with songs with a dance-pop sound such as "Đường cong" ("Curves"), "Bay" ("Fly"), "Taxi", and "Xinh" ("Pretty").

In addition, Thu Minh has won the championship in the show Dancing with the Stars (on Vietnamese TV) (2011). In 2012 and 2017 she was one of four judges and coaches on the reality show The Voice of Vietnam. Phạm Thị Hương Tràm and Ali Hoàng Dương, mentored by Thu Minh, became the winners of the 1st and 4th seasons of the show, respectively.

Early life

Thu Minh was born on September 22, 1977, in Hanoi.

Her sister is married and lives in the U.S., while her elder brother's family lives with her parents in Ho Chi Minh City. She lives in Ho Chi Minh city as well. Some media reports cited Thu Minh's father as an artist named Hoang Quan, however this information is inaccurate. In an interview conducted directly with her father by YanTV in 2010, he confirmed that the family is not engaged in art or the entertainment industry, except Thu Minh. He also confirmed that his name is Vu Ngoc Kim.

Career

Late 1980s: Career beginnings

Thu Minh participated in some musical activities and small musical contests during her school days. After graduating from middle school, she studied to be a professional ballet dancer at The Dance School of Ho Chi Minh City.

As the youngest contestant, at the age of 15, Thu Minh had a chance to encounter the most prestigious national contest at that time – Tiếng hát truyền hình – established by The Broadcast of Ho Chi Minh when she saw it from a banner. She did not reveal her idea to family and registered on her own. However, when she reached for the final round, she was eliminated by the contest jury when it figured out that she was too young to qualify for the competition. Thu Minh cried her eyes out. Yet, thanks to her father's later encouragement, she continued to practice and returned to the competition at the age of 16. This time, Thu Minh was still the youngest contestant and she won a gold medal as the first prize. This debut impressed audiences and musical experts with a natural high and strong Soprano C voice by performing two classic Vietnamese hit songs "Bóng cây Kơ-nia" ("The Shadow of the Kapok Tree") and "Tình ca cho em" ("Love song for you") for the highest scores despite the fact that she had never been educated for professional music and was pursuing a professional career as a ballet dancer. Almost 20 years later, "Tình ca cho em" is revealed to be a song that its author, musician Nguyen Nam, wrote for Thu Minh as a gift before she attended the contest when she sang this song again and expressed her feelings about the former musician in his funeral and on an aired ceremony.

1990s – early 2000s: Diversity

Although it was a perfect ticket and highly valued by music professionals, a long period of "treading water" which followed could not help but lead audiences to put her under the list of "the stars that never shine". Even though Thu Minh has been considered as one of the most hard-working and dedicated to music career among Vietnamese singers with powerful passion, enthusiasm and optimism, audiences still couldn't imagine Thu Minh shone the way she should have.

Sharing on that point, Thu Minh presumed that she never regrets, and is even proud of, her career going "slowly, slowly but firmly". Although her love relationship with the musician Hoai Sa could easily generate a great CD or album for her career, Thu Minh admitted that at that time, she actually did not think of pursuing pop music. She only sang because she wanted to sing and to earn enough money for building a private house for her parents. She solely used to sing for bars, discothèque, acoustic cafe, and clubs to stabilize her regular income. When accomplishing the dream, Thu Minh decided to produce and release an album. That is why she almost appeared to be non-participative in Vietnam music and entertainment industry back to those days.

In 2000, Thu Minh sang a duet with one of Vietnam's most famous musicians, Tran Tien, in one of the most favorite songs, "She's carefree", in his own concert entitled Improvisative Tran Tien.

During the period of 1990s and before 2001, Thu Minh often performed classic songs, traditional pre-war and love songs. Some which still get the audience's preference include "Thousand purple revenue" by musician Hoang Trong, "The Shadow of the Kapok Tree" by musician Phan Huynh Dieu, "Giọt mưa thu" of musician Dang The Phong,"Thuyền viễn xứ" of composer Pham Duy,"Thời hoa đỏ" ("The Red Flower") of poet Thanh Tung. In addition, foreign songs like "the seasonal flowers Domino" had been broadcast repeatedly on the governed Broadcast VTV. She also performed English classic hits of divas such as Whitney Houston and Celine Dion to appreciative live audiences. Especially, since then, her singing techniques and style has been strongly influenced by her biggest idol, Whitney Houston.

In 2001, she produced her first album Ước mơ (Dream) including her first hit single, "Nhớ anh" ("Missing you"). This was covered from the original version of male singer Ky Phuong and achieved remarkable recognition in the top ten favourite songs of the year voted by audience through Làn Sóng Xanh in 2001. The English version was made in her fifth album, What if, in 2004.

Until 2004, the first private concert supported and organised by Friends program organized by HTV Broadcast for the intention of Vietnam–China cultural exchange with the presence of singer Fann Wong. This was a disadvantage for Thu Minh as she did not have much support and experienced guidance from someone in the entertainment industry when the sound system as well as its rotating stage did not lend itself to singing alone.

2004–2008: Album Heaven

Initially presented as a "girl next door", Thu Minh was well known as a professional and classic singer. She only attempted to perform Vietnamese classic hit songs that praised or mentioned Vietnam wars, patriotism, fatherland, and love in wars. Her second albums Lời cuối (Last quote) was released in 2003. Though the songs and vocal technique were well received, her popularity and sales were still low.

She then decided to coordinate with musician Vo Thien Thanh to release her third dance-oriented album with 3 CDs named Thiên đàng (Heaven), also the same name of her first live show in 2004. This album seemingly opened a heaven for her career. Although Thu Minh owned a great degree of artistic credibility before, her Thiên đàng album began to conquer professional dance-pop music in Vietnam. Her strong and unique voice was noticed, which soon gave her a leading position among Dance-pop singers. Vietnamese musical specialists and experts were impressed by the high artistic quality of Vietnamese hit dance-pop songs in this album such as "Bóng mây qua thềm", "Chuông gió"("Wind chime") and "Ngày của tôi" ("My day"). Along with new songs, she also achieved success performing completely different versions of some famous classic songs such as "60 năm cuộc đời" ("60 years of life"), "Cho em một ngày thôi" ("'Give me one day only") a duo with Vietnamese diva Thanh Lam, "Hoa sữa" ("Milkwood pine") a duo with Thanh Lam, and "Xích lô" ("Cyclo"). Thu Minh also blew the audience away at her Belting (now known as Thu Minh's feature) as well as with her beautiful, bright voice when performing live on some English hits including "Ave Maria", "All by Myself", "Queen of the Night", and "Tell Him". This third album received notable music awards and nominations in Vietnam.

In 2004, Thu Minh took a creative move to establish TM Solutions as her own company to serve for her own artistic activities and for business.

Her favored genre and personality in her music is pop ballad. Thu Minh covered many immortal English songs of popular singers like Celine Dion, Mariah Carey, or Whitney Houston. These have been so familiar to many Vietnamese who love international music since the late 1990s in Vietnam such that "All by Myself", "Saving All My Love for You", "The Reason", "Queen of the Night", "It's All Coming Back to Me Now", "Ave Maria" in Schubert's version were performed successfully. Among many great international singers, Thu Minh is greatly influenced by Whitney Houston as Thu Minh's performing style, charisma and vocal technique are somewhat a mirror reflected by Whitney's in soul songs such as: "I Will Always Love You", "Saving All My Love for You", "I Have Nothing" or "Queen of the Night". Sharing her thoughts on idol Houston, Thu Minh expressed her huge admiration for the strong, emotional voice of this departed Diva when the news of her death was reported: "Indeed, Whitney owned an endowed rare vocal in the world: both rich, warm and high. Particularly with only Whitney Houston, she did not only have the ability to sing  for easy listening, but also could field the high and tough notes with quirky techniques, which demonstrated her gorgeous class. Whitney owned all the prosperous elements to become the worldwide diva. Her voice was internally powerful and fully energetic, sometimes melodious, sometimes warmly high and always rich, full of marvelous, powerful sounds. I believe she had a perfect structure of palate, larynx and vocal cords for music. I appreciate her splendid voice as a precious diamond."

Owning a high and powerful soprano C voice, in the intermittent low notes Thu Minh presented without recognizable speciality. After her efforts to learn from many international singers and especially inspired by Whitney Houston, she gradually overcame this drawback. She always believed: "fame is not what makes me happiest, but artistic differences and uniqueness", thus, she "always tries to cultivate and train herself for her own 'Thu Minh style', vocal technique and performance style".  Thu Minh also genuinely said that the "frugal","straight-forwarded, critical and perfectionism" in her music career, inherited from her mother, is such a good element for her job because it helps bring the audience her best music performances, regardless of how long it costs in execution time. For example, the album Body Language took two years to complete. Thus, in 2007, Thu Minh had shifted to Boston, Massachusetts, in the US to pursue international education on music and graduated in Berklee College of Music.

After the album Heaven (Thiên đường), the albums My Love (Tình em), What if (Nếu như), and The best of Thu Minh were released in 2005, 2007 and 2008 respectively. Her next album in the same year 2008, I Do, differently covers the scope of ballad songs both in Vietnamese and English. This remarkably highlighted her coordination with newborn model-to-be-singer Nathan Lee, not with wide range of music types (a mix of pop-ballad, Dance-pop and folk songs) like previous albums.

2009–present: Dance-pop and her rise to popularity

Thirteen years after entering music in Vietnam, Thu Minh suddenly changed her music and style remarkably to dance-pop. The albums Ruby - Sixth Sense and Body Language are two outstanding products in this period. Arts Council's Gold Album album reviews Ruby - Sixth Sense thus: Thu Minh is an album worth listening to. This is a music production color consistency from music to content, and images at the same nonetheless modern and professional. The new combination of Thu Minh and Minh Khang has created strange colors and new album. With Body Language, the album is considered "rich rhythmic, youthful," modern civilization ", the majority of content is subject to social, new tunes but close" appears as "breath of fresh air and practical contribution to the development of dance-pop in Vietnam". The album was nominated for Artist of the Year category at the dedication.

Thu Minh returned to prominence in 2010 with the demo single "Đường cong" ("The curve") and in 2011, a pure-dance album Body language (Ngôn ngữ cơ thể) was released. This contained purely 11 dance-pop songs as Thu Minh bravely coordinated with two young musicians Nguyen Hai Phong and former-supermodel-to-be-singer Nathan Lee. Her music videos showed a more sexually provocative and flirtatious personality. Three hit singles which followed are "Đường cong", "Xinh" ("Pretty"), "Bay" ("Fly"), and "Taxi" that all required a high and weighty female voice to hit high notes and a wide range of vocals, flexibility and strong control over changing singing voices as well as belting out notes. With this, Thu Minh has now become "a leading pioneer" who has been involved in quality music recordings in dance-pop of Vietnam, and this latest album which featured 11 Dance-pop songs sold very well. It was one of 2011's five best albums selected and voted on by a group of prestigious composers and music producers, and readers of  Thao & Van Hoa (Sports & Culture) newspaper.

From then on, "sexiness is my brand" she claimed. Thus, her performance style on stage changed to be more appropriate with dance-pop yet she claimed that her personality in her private life is a different story and unchanged. This new style brought many controversial opinions from the public. Some viewers objected to the innovation in the style of her music, but some had sympathy and support for her breakthrough move which has brought about a colorful style and a pioneering creative thinking in music industry. About this change, she told in the program Leo & U of the YanTV channel that this change stemmed from her changing her former conservative attitudes about her music career. She now wanted to share and bring her music closer to public tastes in order to lead them. In this genre, with seasoned experience and her powerful soprano C vocal, she is actually a pioneer in style of dance-pop music through her professional, powerful, technical, and emotional vocals and techniques. Despite being unhappy with the changes, the majority of audiences still highly value Thu Minh's career on her vocals and technical expertise.

The same year 2011, Thu Minh won a gold medal in the folk music category in the "ASEAN Golden Voice Festival 2010" competition with the performance of "Bóng cây Kơ-nia" and also won the prize of "Favourite Singer" in this competition.

Recently, on 12 November 2012, Thu Minh introduction demo of a single called "Love you only/ Yêu mình anh" on her Facebook. This song is the main soundtrack for movie "Cold Summer" which will be released in the late of 2012. Also, this is the first work in Vietnam of famous producer Dada, who have had long experience in producing movie soundtracks music for years in Singapore and the United States. The producer expressed a great impression with her voice and techniques so that he decided to change the entire structure and spirit of the song after two hours of draft recording.

Also, her album "Body Language" was received a mega mix by a famous producer/remixer/DJ named Robin Skouteris. This is a contribution for her music to be more visible to foreign audience as this video received national attention spreading-widely so that online news from other countries like India stated that she is "one of superstar of Vietnam and one of the best vocalist of Vietnam in many many genre" 

On 24 November 2012, Thu Minh participated in Korean global concert M-Live MO.A (Most Amazing) in Vietnam to celebrate 20 years of relations between Korea and Vietnam. She shared her thoughts on it saying, "Korea is the place of the ′Miracle of Hangang′, which affected its industries, economy and technology, so its determination to develop its cultural industry also is very high compared to other countries. Only such cultural exchanges like MO.A for the 20th anniversary of ties between the countries will help them become true 20-year friends". In this concert, she performed her new single "Love you only/ Yêu mình anh" and her big hits from her album, Body Language, in the Mega-mix version by Robin Skouteris both for the first time on stage. The first song got impressive and enormous compliments on her extremely powerful high notes from the local and international audiences. Controversially, the Mega-mix part had sound technical problems that made her voice from micro a bit smaller and weaker than that of the first performance that was realised by live audiences and the press at the back or up stage. Thu Minh was upset because it was not as good as her expectation without blaming on anyone and refusing to talk more on this, yet as a singer of a firm stuff, she managed well on stage, performed at her best with enthusiasm and 'burned' the whole stage for it. The Vietnamese audience was excessively shouting out her name and singing along during her performances. Her performances still brought a true pride for Vietnam after Van Mai Huong's not outstanding performance as one of the two Vietnamese representatives in MO.A.

Other appearances on media

In addition to singing, Thu Minh also participated in dancing and acting. In 2005, Thu Minh received an invitation for the role, named "Ai", in the series Tinh yeu con mai from its film director. Her character was a strong-willed woman who is poor and undergoes multiple jobs to survive, which suits Thu Minh's personality the most as the director mentioned as his reason to invite her.
 
In 2008, Thu Minh portraited one role of the soap opera named Lan and Diep on stage and received a warm welcome from the audiences.

In 2010–11, in spite of the failure of the series Anh chang vuot thoi gian resulting from a poor plot, the press highlighted that while all other experienced actors and actresses (Huynh Anh Tuan, Kim Hien, Hua Vi Van, Thuy Huong, Don Nguyen) were insulted for solely acting and reading quotes without emotions, Thu Minh – a singer-to-be-temporary-actress – was praised to be the only one being persuasive in her acting role.

At the end of 2011, Thu Minh also won first prize "Queen of Dancesport" in Dancing with the Stars (Vietnamese)" competition.  It is generally agreed that Thu Minh deserved the win for her spectacular and outstanding Rumba and Freestyle routines recording the two highest scores in the show's history and was praised by the most talented former dancesport couple in Vietnam Khanh Thi and Chi Anh. The audience was given a chance to acknowledge that Thu Minh has not only has a good voice, but also owns an exquisite beauty and technical virtuosity in each routine and her dancing. She proved an enthusiastic effort and a determination throughout practices. Although the audience anticipated the result at the beginning of the show, holding the thought that there are many advantages for her from her previous ballet training, Thu Minh thought differently. She said what had been assumed as her strength was actually her weaknesses because ballet and dancesport are technically opposite – even the way of the legs moving and standing. Hence, she was still a beginner.

Thu Minh declared that she considers dancesport as "lovers, still in love but could not see it again because of a fear for love blossoming". After Dancing With the Stars in 2011, Thu Minh had been "feeling the miss of its abrupt ending for a long time". It is said that Thu Minh led many of her fans and colleagues to respect and feel an empathy for her artistic performance and drastic efforts in each of her artistic fields, the Northern-originated singer has always been committed into a challenge and attempting to play her best in any role. Judge Khanh Thi mentioned Thu Minh as a hard-working candidate who was the only contestant not showing many "trifling skill" to put a cover on error routines like other candidates but attempting to show skillful techniques of dancesport. She mainly focused and boldly tried to imitate routines and style of a 'real' professional dancer throughout the competition.

In 2012, she became one of four judges for the current hot show in Vietnam The Voice of Vietnam. Thu Minh truly found her explosive fame and success through her talented mentoring, a sane judgment and a sensible art instinct. Through each round, she proved strongly to be more brilliant with her mentoring position since Thu Minh's team is still anticipated to be at the top at the end of this year. She is claimed to be the most favourite judge by contestants and audiences due to her strong voice and notable experiences throughout the show. The reality show presented another aspects of Thu Minh in terms of bold multi-talent, being sensitive, loving, sincere, skillful and witty without aggressiveness. With tactful sanity from setting up the place – at the castle of Khai Silk – to directly mentoring and inviting selectively elite support from musician Nguyen Hai Phong and Vietnam's diva Hồng Nhung in order to fulfill all students with skillful and advantageous performance and tutorials, Thu Minh's team was expected to be a prosperous package of surprises and marvellous creativity each night.

On 13 January 2013, Huong Tram (top 4 of contestants The Voice of Vietnam from Thu Minh team) was officially crowned as the champion of The Voice in Vietnam for the first season with an outstanding performances with a great contribution of Thu Minh in clever song choices, creative and bold move of modifying the performance.

Although the audience does not really happy with the stage number of public votes transparency of Vietnamese voice, however, most viewers will get the winner of Huong Tram totally convinced and the role of Thu Minh shown in this victory. After winning the vocal Viet, many dedicated Thu Minh to call her as "A tactful and clever woman" to show their admiration for her talent in coaching, professional music ability, and sharply intelligence. Many viewers and artists in the studio (Nathan Lee, Tran Thanh, ...) non-stop excitement and cheering the repertoire of incense at the hands of training and elaborate on the idea of Thu Minh . "On the edge of Phu Van", building new tracks and sharp incense helped the show be considered the highlight of the finale and is said to have left the ball long version diva Mỹ Linh in a spectacular way. In the second song - "Queen of the Night" - Thu Minh has proved a way look suggestive, creativity, fun and smart when making an entire choir on stage, in which 13 contestants Her team has gone before, the stage background vocals make for the iconic "Little diva" Huong Tram. At the same time, this action is also part of showing beautiful and friendly images of solidarity and collective victory of team Thu Minh. In this regard Thu Minh really has done more than the personal victory of Huong Tram. Many audience members touched and impressed when seeing coach Thu Minh herself standing shoulder conductor professional choral conductor and enthusiasm. In the third song, though the song associated her name with the incense on the stage, the audience again see how intelligent processing of this coach in moderation to create bright spots and opportunities for their students with the hit song "curve".

What makes many viewers really regret is now evening 01/14/2013, Thu Minh airport officially up to European settlement some time to wholeheartedly take care of her little family. She also confirmed that they would leave the bench coach next season. If other coaches trust, she should still be available in an advisory role for the immediate future, she can not be there regularly in Vietnam. Also, if the organizing committee is courtesy, Thu Minh will return to bench coach for the following season.

In 2015 and 2016, Thu Minh returned to Vietnamese television as a judge on Vietnam Idol, replacing Mỹ Tâm, who filled in her vacant chair on The Voice. She was described as a strict, but devoted and kind judge.

Thu Minh eventually returned to The Voice of Vietnam for its fourth season in 2017, and once again her final act, Ali Hoàng Dương, was crowned the winner. Thu Minh also became the first coach in the show's history to win twice.

Music controversies

Around 2003, the song entitled in "Phut giay dau" ("The first moment") in her Last Quote album has been preferred by many youngsters after appearing in a YoMost's advertisement for seasonal Valentine marketing. This song also is performed by Thu Minh in both English and Vietnamese. Many youngsters believe that the English version of song "The First Moment" which has spread widely on network belongs to singer Martina McBride. However, the information is quite biased and inaccurate since during Martina's entire music career, there is no existence of the song "The First Moment" performed by Martina in any live show, and in any album or single. Additionally, most of the links (that state Martina McBride sings this song) are apparently from Vietnam's IP and sites.

Personal life

Thu Minh has a few best friends in music industry, two of them are singer Minh Tu in the Tam Ca Ao Trang female band and singer My Le (a daughter of musician Hoàng Sông Hương). Some other  friends include Đoan Trang, Nathan Lee, Duc Tuan, Đàm Vĩnh Hưng, and Phương Thanh. Her nickname among close friends and families is Cat.

Thu Minh had a first love which lasted more than eight years with musician Hoai Sa. They met and went together after many mutual performances on stage when Thu Minh was (only 17-year-old) a new 'toddler' entering into music industry while Hoai Sa was playing the piano for his band. Artists, at that time, used to say they were like a golden couple. Thu Minh has frankly admitted that she fell in love with her second love before separating with Hoai Sa and that this is immoral behavior when disrespecting and hurting her first love. But it also helped her to not repeat her mistakes later in life. Hoai Sa admitted after three years of separation, he realised the reason Thu Minh left him was due to his "carefree", and "unstable" lifestyle. Hoai Sa also gave a praise to say Thu Minh is "foresighted, smart, successful" but "dignified and serious in [love] selection" and a woman that "only the most sincere man will win".

On 21 Dec 2012, after numerous rumors on whether she had tied the knot 2 months ago, in an interview with the press, she declared that now it can be said that she is married and has worn a wedding ring for two months. Some paparazzi pointed out that this can be easily recognized when she started wearing a more plain ring which matches the ring on Otto's (her husband) left hand though she may have intended to wear it on her right hand (yet, wearing ring on the right hand is actually a tradition in some Europe countries including the Netherlands). It is also expected that Thu Minh would never hold a big wedding celebration involving the public and the press in Vietnam since she is well known for being quite secretive in her love life. This could be a reason that she may have chosen to celebrate this only with some close friends and families − to avoid the public attention. Besides, because Thu Minh only has contact regularly with very few co-workers at a personal level, the news, hence, was not widespread and was under cover for a while. Till now, the public only acknowledges her husband's face and he is a Dutch businessman (Her husband's name has recently been revealed as Otto  de Jager). Her husband appeared on the event she held on 21 December 2012 as an event to introduce her husband and celebrate the ended year 2012. In this event, he also spoke sincerely in Vietnamese though not much to thank the press, but expressed his willing to keep their relationship secretive. He also called Thu Minh his wife and teased her for being talkative

Awards 
 1993: First prize − Tieng hat truyen hinh National Singing Competition
 2003: Top 10 − Lan song xanh Award - for "Missing you"
 2006: Best Song of the Month − Bai hat Viet Award - for "Wind chime"
 2006: Best Song of the Year − Bai hat Viet Award - for Wind chime
 2007: Best Album of the Year − Gold Album Award - for Emerald - Heaven 
 2011: Favorite Singer − ASEAN Golden Voice Festival Award
 2011: Silver Prize in Pop − ASEAN Golden Voice Festival Award - for "I Have Nothing"
 2011: Gold Prize in Folk − ASEAN Golden Voice Festival Award - for "The Shadow of Kapok Tree"
 2011: First Prize − Dancing with the Stars (Vietnamese TV series) (season 2, Vietnam) - duo with Lachezar Todorov
 2013: 15th Mnet Asian Music Awards – Best Asian Artist: Vietnam

Discography 
 Vol.1 Dreams (2001)
 Vol.2 Last quote (2003)
 Vol.3 What if (2004)
 Vol.4 My love (2005)
 Heaven − Emerald (2006)
 I Do − Pearl (2008)
 6th Sense − Ruby (2010)
 Body Language (2011)
 Single Love you only/ Yêu mình anh (2012)

Tours and live shows 
 2004: Friendship Melody Concert
 2006: Liveshow "Heaven"
 2009: Em Dep Nhat Dem Nay (You Are Most Beautiful Tonight) Music Gala
 2009: Van Son 48
 2009: Diva's night 1 and 2 (My Le live show)
 Jan 2012: The 19th Duyen Dang Viet Nam (Charming Vietnam)
 2012: So phan (Destiny) (Dam Vinh Hung liveshow)
 Jun–Jul,Sept 2012: Sea Show
 24 Nov 2012: K-Pop Global Concert MO.A (Most Amazing) − 20th Korea−Vietnam relations celebration
 5-6 Dec 2012: Red Revolution in Hanoi
 8 Dec 2012: Am nhac va Buoc nhay thang 12; Mobilefone event at Nha hat Hoa Binh
 15 Dec 2012: Mobilefone event (duo with My Tam and Uyen Linh)
 19-20 Dec 2012: Red Revolution in Ho Chi Minh City
 20 Dec 2012: Lan Song Xanh 15 years celebration (duo with Hong Nhung)

Filmography 
 2005: Tinh yeu con mai, as Ms. Ai
 2008: Lan and Diep soap opera, as Ms. Thuy Lieu
 2011: Anh chang vuot thoi gian, as Highest Imperial Consort "Le Lieu"

References

External links

1977 births
Living people
People from Hanoi
21st-century Vietnamese women singers
Vietnamese pop singers
Vietnamese LGBT rights activists